There are several lists of meteorite impacts of various types available:

 :Category:Lists of impact craters contains lists on various planets, including Earth by continent
 Meteorite falls are observed
 Meteorite finds are rocks found on the ground which are geologically identified as meteorites
 Meteorite contains lists of the most notable of all of these